Inner Mongolia Suite, Op. 9, is a suite for violin and piano by Ma Sicong (1912-1987). The Suite was composed in 1937 after Ma's return from a trip to Suiyuan province, and published under the title Suiyuan Suite; it was renamed after Suiyuan was incorporated into Inner Mongolia in 1954. Its three movements, based on traditional music of the Suiyuan region, are:
I. Epic
II. Nostalgia
III. Dances Beyond the Frontier.

The second movement, Nostalgia is Ma's most famous work. It is still frequently played in concerts.

References

Compositions for violin
1937 compositions
Inner Mongolia
Suites (music)